This is a list of all seasons played by Nottingham Forest Football Club, from their first entry into the FA Cup in 1878 to their last completed season in 2022. It details the club's performance in every competition entered, as well as the top scorers for each season. Top scorers in bold were also the top scorers in the English league that season.

Seasons

Overall
Seasons spent at Level 1 of the football league system: 57
Seasons spent at Level 2 of the football league system: 58
Seasons spent at Level 3 of the football league system: 5
Seasons spent at Level 4 of the football league system: 0

Key

P – Played
W – Games won
D – Games drawn
L – Games lost
GF – Goals for
GA – Goals against
Pts – Points
Pos – Final position

Prem – Premier League
Champ – EFL Championship
Lge 1 – EFL League One
Div 1 – Football League First Division
Div 2 – Football League Second Division
Div 3S – Football League Third Division South
FA – Football Alliance
n/a – Not applicable

R1 – Round 1
R2 – Round 2
R3 – Round 3
R4 – Round 4
R5 – Round 5
QF – Quarter-finals
SF – Semi-finals
RU – Runners-up
W – Winners
(S) – Southern section of regionalised stage

Notes

References

Seasons
 
English football club seasons
Nottingham-related lists